Mallemala Entertainments is an Indian media and entertainment company which produces films and television programs. Its television productions include reality TV shows, comedy shows, game shows, entertainment and factual programming in Telugu.  

Its notable productions includes TV shows like Jabardasth, Extra Jabardasth, Star Mahila, Dhee, and Manasu Mamata. It produced films like Ammoru (1995), Anji (2004), and Arundhati (2009). Mallemala Entertainments also owns the entertainment website 123Telugu.com.

History 
Shyam Prasad Reddy made his debut as a producer in Tollywood with the film Thalambralu in 1987 under the banner M. S. Art Movies. Later in 1992, he founded Mallemala Entertainments and started producing films under this banner. He ventured into Television with the reality game show Star Mahila which became a popular show of the time.

Over the time, the company continued to produce various shows and series on television and became a complete television-only production company.

Films

Television shows

Digital media 
Mallemala Entertainments also owns the entertainment website 123Telugu.com. It features information on film news and updates, film reviews, interviews with entertainment personalities, OTT and TV news. The website is available in both Telugu and English languages.

See also 
 M. S. Reddy

References 

Film production companies of India
Film production companies of Andhra Pradesh
Television production companies of India
Indian companies established in 1992
Entertainment companies established in 1992
1992 establishments in Andhra Pradesh